The roads in Louisville, Kentucky include Interstates 64, 65 and 71, with an interchange in the city center. There are six U.S. highways serving the city. Two beltways surround Louisville.

Interstates

U.S. Highways

State routes

Notes

Renamed streets

See also

 Transportation in Louisville, Kentucky
 Transit Authority of River City (TARC)
 Ohio River Bridges Project
 List of numbered highways in Kentucky
 Kentucky Transportation Cabinet

References

 Kentucky Transportation Cabinet, State Primary Road System, Jefferson County

Further reading
 

Transportation in Louisville, Kentucky
Louisville
Louisville, Kentucky-related lists